Amadou & Mariam are a musical duo from Mali, composed of the Bamako-born couple Amadou Bagayoko (guitar and vocals) (born 24 October 1954) and Mariam Doumbia (vocals) (born 15 April 1958).

Their album Welcome To Mali (2008) was nominated for a Grammy Award for Best Contemporary World Music Album.

Amadou lost his vision at the age of 16, while Mariam became blind at age 5 as a consequence of untreated measles. Known as "the blind couple from Mali", they met at Mali's Institute for the Young Blind, where they both performed at the Institute's Eclipse Orchestra, directed by Idrissa Soumaouro, and found they shared an interest in music.

Style
The duo's early recordings in the 1980s and 1990s featured sparse arrangements of guitar and voice. Since the late 1990s Amadou & Mariam have produced music that mixes traditional Mali sound with rock guitars, Syrian violins, Cuban trumpets, Egyptian ney, Indian tablas and Dogon percussion. In combination these elements have been called "Afro-blues".

Career
By 1985 the couple had made a name for themselves playing Malian blues. They embarked on a tour of Burkina Faso. In 1986 the couple moved to Côte d'Ivoire and recorded several cassette albums. During this time they met Stevie Wonder, and the duo started playing at festivals around the world.

By 1996 the duo moved to Paris where they were signed to Polygram's Emarcy label. In 1998 they released their first album recorded outside of Africa, Sou Ni Tile. The track "Je pense à toi" was a hit on French radio and the album went on to sell 100,000 copies. In 2003 they were approached by World–Latin music star Manu Chao, who then produced their 2004 album Dimanche à Bamako ("Sunday in Bamako"), which also features his distinctive vocals.

In 2005 The Côte d'Ivoire recordings were released for the first time on CD as a limited edition box set and "best of" collection, 1990–1995: Le Meilleur Des Années Maliennes. Amadou & Mariam won the French Victoire de la Musique prize for best World Music album of the year with Dimanche à Bamako. On 26 October (2005) after their show at the Olympia in Paris, they were awarded a platinum disc by the French Ministry of Culture for selling 300,000 units of Dimanche à Bamako. They also won two BBC Radio 3 Awards for World Music in the African and Best Album categories for Dimanche à Bamako. In 2006, they recorded, together with Herbert Grönemeyer, the official anthem for the 2006 FIFA World Cup "Celebrate the Day" (German: "Zeit, dass sich was dreht"). The song topped the German charts in June 2006. They went on to play major festivals in the US including Coachella and Lollapalooza. On 26 June 2007 they took part in Damon Albarn's "Africa Express" project at Glastonbury with a line-up including Rachid Taha, K'Naan, Tony Allen, Fat Boy Slim and Tinariwen. This was also their first encounter with Jake Shears of the Scissor Sisters. They then supported the Scissor Sisters on their UK tour, including three nights at London's O2 Arena . In summer of 2008, they played the Lollapalooza music festival in Chicago, Illinois and the Latitude Festival in Henham Park, Suffolk.

In 2008 they released their 6th album Welcome To Mali with the participation of K'Naan, Keziah Jones, -M- and Damon Albarn. Their song "Sabali" was placed 15 on Pitchfork Media'''s Top 100 Best Tracks of 2008. It also became the most-played French single worldwide of 2009. In the same year they had played the main stage at Glastonbury Festival.

Amadou & Mariam won the Best Group category in the inaugural Songlines Music Awards (2009) – announced 1 May 2009 – the new world music awards organised by the UK-based magazine, Songlines. On 26 May, they played a gig to support the homeless charity Crisis at the Union Chapel, in north London where they were joined on stage by their hero, Pink Floyd's guitarist, David Gilmour, who played second guitar supporting the whole 80-minute set and a 5-minute encore. On 8 June, they performed on Late Night with Jimmy Fallon on US TV Channel NBC. That same year, they supported Blur during their two reunion gigs in Hyde Park and also supported UK based band Coldplay on their Viva la Vida Tour on 8 shows. They also performed their duo set L’Afrique C’est Chic at the Jazz Cafe in London where they were joined on-stage by special guests including Theophilus London, Beth Orton, Krystle Warren; and they performed a headline show at the Roundhouse, London as part of the iTunes Festival. Also in the 2009, they became Zeitz Foundation Ambassadors for Culture (Art); they help raise awareness and shape activities in their respective dimension. They performed live at the 2009 Nobel Peace Prize ceremony.

In 2010 their joint autobiography Away From the Light of Day was published in the UK by Route Publishing. On 11 June, Amadou & Mariam appeared on FIFA's Kick-Off Celebration for 2010's World Cup, hosted in South Africa, alongside Alicia Keys, John Legend, Tinariwen and Shakira in front of 80,000 people and hundreds of millions of TV viewers. That same year, Amadou & Mariam contributed the song "Tambara" to the Enough Project and Downtown Records' Raise Hope for Congo compilation. Proceeds from the compilation fund efforts to make the protection and empowerment of Congo's women a priority, as well as inspire individuals around the world to raise their voice for peace in Congo. Welcome To Mali was nominated for a Grammy Award for Best Contemporary World Music Album at the 52nd Annual Grammy Awards. They were chosen by Matt Groening to perform at the edition of the All Tomorrow's Parties festival he curated in May 2010 in Minehead, England.
 
In February 2011, Amadou & Mariam performed as one of the support acts for U2 during the Johannesburg and Cape Town legs of their U2 360 Tour. In July, they performed their first concerts in the dark, Eclipse, which were commissioned by the Manchester International Festival. They went on to stage these shows in London in November 2011, and in Paris in January 2012. In 2011, they also became ambassadors for the World Food Programme. They travelled to Haïti and offered a new song "Labendela" (Children are the future) as an anthem. Their early biography Away From The Light of Day was published in the US.

Their eighth album Folila was released on 2 April 2012. Folila, which means "music" in Bambara, was recorded in Bamako and New York with special guests including Santigold, TV on the Radio, and Jake Shears. The first single of the album "Dougou Badia" was released on 20 January.  The track featuring guest appearance of Santigold, was hailed by the NME as "a chuffing great masterstroke of genre-less genre mixing". In France, the track "Oh Amadou" which is a duet with Bertrand Cantat, was chosen as a single.

On 22 September 2017 they released their album La Confusion to mixed reviews.

Discography

Studio albums

Compilations
2005: Je pense à toi: The Best of Amadou & Mariam2006: 1990–1995 Le Meilleur des Années Maliennes2007: Paris Bamako (DVD + CD 12 titres live)
2009: The Magic Couple: The Best of Amadou & Mariam 1997–2002Contributing artist
2010: The Rough Guide To Desert Blues''

Singles
(Selective / charting)

References

External links
 
Amadou and Miriam Biography and Discography on Soukous.com

Blind musicians
Malian musical groups
World music groups
Worldbeat groups
Musical duos
Malian emigrants to France
Ambassadors of supra-national bodies
World Food Programme people
People from Bamako
Because Music artists
Nonesuch Records artists
Polydor Records artists
EmArcy Records artists
Bambara-language singers